Abu Yasser al-Issawi (born Jabbar Salman Saleh Ali Al-Issawi, 1978 – 28 January 2021) was a senior ISIS commander and Iraqi terrorist with the title of deputy caliph, and leader of the ISIS group in Iraq. He was killed in a military strike by Iraqi security forces in Al-Chai Valley, southern Kirkuk. The successful military strike and his death was announced by Iraqi Prime Minister Mustafa Al-Kadhimi after an intelligence-led operation.

However, The New York Times reported that al-Issawi, who was 43 years old and originally from Fallujah, died from an American airstrike, days after the Baghdad bombings.

References

1978 births
2021 deaths
21st-century caliphs
21st-century Iraqi criminals
21st-century Muslims
Deaths by airstrike
Genocide perpetrators
Iraqi male criminals
Iraqi mass murderers
Islamic State of Iraq and the Levant members from Iraq
Leaders of Islamic terror groups
People from Fallujah
Salafi jihadists